The Defterdar Ibrahim Pasha Mosque ("Mosque of Defterdar Ibrahim Pasha") is an Ottoman-era mosque in the island of Kos, in Greece. Built in the 18th century, it serves the Muslim-Turkish community of Kos, as one of the two out of the five Ottoman mosques to be still operational and open for prayers on Kos, the other being the Gazi Hasan Pasha Mosque.

History 
The mosque received its name from Ibrahim Efendi, an Ottoman minister of finance, who ordered its construction at the close of the 18th century. It has been suggested that it was previously an Orthodox church dedicated to Saint Paraskevi.

The mosque was severely damaged the great earthquakes that hit Kos in the years 1926 and 1933. The Italians, who held Kos at the time, carried out extensive restoration, which included the removal of the upper part of the minaret and its restoration. Due to extensive damage however, the minaret had to undergo another round of restoration in 2004-2005. Apart from Italian restoration work, it has not been systematically maintained to date.

It was heavily damaged by an 2017 earthquake, during which the minaret collapsed.

Structure 
Standing on Eleftherias Square in the town of Kos, it is a two-story building of cubic form, with an octagonal dome supported by twelve arches. It is built with hewn ashlars; larger ones on the ground floor and in the lower sections and smaller ones on the first floor, arranged according to the iso-building system. Defterdar Mosque has six windows, in pairs of two placed under an arch each, but which do not end in an arch like those on the other sides, and a high cornice, which surrounds the pediment on three sides.

On the first floor there is the square prayer room, which through two doors communicates with the narrow and elongated narthex to the north. The latter is accessed by two brick staircases located on the east and west sides, respectively. The eastern staircase, the top of which is covered by a double-domed propylon, was intended for the entrance of officials to the mosque. On the north side of the main hall there is an elevated wooden gynakonitis, the quarters for women. The mihrab and the minber are on the south side.

On the west side of the mosque stands the minaret, which has a single portico with a parapet, while a little beyond there is a marble octagonal fountain, covered with a vaulted building supported by six arches and short columns.

Gallery

See also 

 Islam in Greece
 List of mosques in Greece
 Ibrahim Pasha Mosque, Rhodes

References

Further reading 
 History of the Island of Kos: Ancient, Medieval, Modern, by Vasilis S. Hatzivasileiou, published 2013.

External links 
 

Ottoman mosques in Greece
Kos
18th-century mosques
18th-century architecture in Greece
Mosque buildings with domes